Karka d-Ledan, also known as Eranshahr-Shapur, and Eran asan kar(t) Kavad, was one of the four Sasanian major cities of Khuzestan. It was (re)founded by King of Kings (shahanshah) Shapur II in 338, who had a winter palace established there. Karka d-Ledan is identified with the modern site of Ivan-e Kerkha.

References

Sources 
 
 
 
 
 

Sasanian cities
Shapur II